A wild mouse is a type of roller coaster consisting of single or spinning cars traversing a tight-winding track with an emphasis on sharp, unbanked turns. The upper portion of the track usually features multiple 180-degree turns, known as flat turns, that produce high lateral G-forces even at modest speeds. Cars are often designed to be wider than the track to enhance the illusion of hanging over the edge. Lower portions of the track typically feature small hills and bunny hops. Wild mouse coasters first appeared in the 1950s, and following a period of decline in the 1980s, new innovations and layout designs in the late 1990s led to a resurgence in demand.

History
During the 1950s, wild mouse roller coasters began to appear at amusement parks and traveling fairs throughout the United States. One of the earliest manufacturers, B.A. Schiff & Associates, made over 70 beginning as early as 1950. The company was founded by Ben Schiff in what is believed to be 1947, and it ceased operation in 1960 following an acquisition. Schiff offered two general models – one for stationary parks and a smaller, portable model for traveling fairs. None of the rides produced by the company remain in operation.

The modern Wild Mouse was invented by German designer Franz Mack. In the original wooden Wild Mouse coasters of the 1960s and 1970s, the cars were so small that they could only fit two adults in close contact.  While the low capacity of these rides led to long lines, the cars were small by design.

Throughout the 1970s and 1980s, the Wild Mouse-type roller coaster was nearly extinct. However, beginning in the mid-1990s, Wild Mouse-style rides made a comeback for two reasons: first, they were cheaper than larger, conventional coasters; second, they added to a park's "coaster count" with minimal impact on cost and area.

Installations

References

External links

 Wild Mouse Rides:  Early History in North America
 Amusement Ride Extravaganza - Wild Mouse History in Australia

Wild Mouse roller coasters
Types of roller coaster